James Horner (born 1880) was an English professional footballer who played as a goalkeeper.

References

1880 births
People from Kirkby
English footballers
Association football goalkeepers
Grimsby Town F.C. players
Grimsby Rovers F.C. players
Grimsby Rangers F.C. players
Grimsby Thursday F.C. players
Rotherham County F.C. players
English Football League players
Year of death missing